The 1982 Chicago White Sox season was their 82nd season in the major leagues, and 83rd season overall.

Offseason 
 December 11, 1981: Todd Cruz, Rod Allen, and Jim Essian were traded to the Seattle Mariners for Tom Paciorek.
 March 21, 1982: Ross Baumgarten and Butch Edge were traded to the Pittsburgh Pirates for Vance Law and Ernie Camacho.
 March 29, 1982: George Riley was released.

Regular season

Season standings

Record vs. opponents

Opening Day lineup 
 Ron LeFlore, CF
 Tony Bernazard, 2B
 Steve Kemp, LF
 Greg Luzinski, DH
 Tom Paciorek, 1B
 Carlton Fisk, C
 Harold Baines, RF
 Jim Morrison, 3B
 Bill Almon, SS
 Jerry Koosman, P

Notable transactions 
 April 2: Wayne Nordhagen was traded to the Toronto Blue Jays for Aurelio Rodríguez.
 June 7: Kenny Williams was selected in the third round of the 1982 Major League Baseball draft.
 August 21: Sparky Lyle was purchased from the Philadelphia Phillies.

Roster

Player stats

Batting 
Note: G = Games played; AB = At bats; R = Runs scored; H = Hits; 2B = Doubles; 3B = Triples; HR = Home runs; RBI = Runs batted in; BB = Base on balls; SO = Strikeouts; AVG = Batting average; SB = Stolen bases

Pitching 
Note: W = Wins; L = Losses; ERA = Earned run average; G = Games pitched; GS = Games started; SV = Saves; IP = Innings pitched; H = Hits allowed; R = Runs allowed; ER = Earned runs allowed; HR = Home runs allowed; BB = Walks allowed; K = Strikeouts

Farm system 

LEAGUE CHAMPIONS: Appleton, Niagara Falls

Notes

References 
 1982 Chicago White Sox at Baseball Reference

Chicago White Sox seasons
Chicago White Sox season
Chicago